Irreligion is prevalent in Germany. Following near universal adoption of Christianity, religious traditions in Germany were weakened by the rule of the Nazi Party during World War II and the subsequent rule of the Socialist Unity Party in East Germany during the Cold War. As of 2021, approximately 42% of Germans are irreligious, with a significantly higher concentration of irreligious citizens in East Germany. Eastern Germany, which was historically Protestant, is perhaps the least religious region in the world.

History 
One early irreligious German philosopher was Ludwig Feuerbach, who developed a theory of anthropological materialism in his book The Essence of Christianity. Feuerbach's work influenced contemporaries Karl Marx and Friedrich Engels in their writings against religion. The Freethought movement gained support in Germany during the 19th century. The secular coming of age ceremony Jugendweihe was developed in the 1850s, and Ludwig Büchner founded the German Freethinkers League in 1881. 

After its unification in the 1870s, the German Empire sought to resist attempts by the Catholic Church to impose its authority over the empire's sovereignty. During the Kulturkampf, Germany passed several laws that limited the power of religious authorities over the state. Friedrich Nietzsche was a notable voice in German irreligion at this time, famously declaring that "God is dead" in his works The Gay Science and Thus Spoke Zarathustra, predicting further growth of irreligion as a result of Enlightenment ideas.

The Weimar Republic guaranteed freedom of religion when its constitution came into force in 1919. After the Nazi Party took control of the country in 1933, constitutional protections were ignored in Nazi Germany. Secular and Freethought movements were banned, including the German Freethinkers League, which by then had grown to about 500,000 members. By 1939, 1.5% of Germans were irreligious.

After World War II, Germany was divided into East and West Germany. While West Germany allowed for religious protections, East Germany enacted a system of state atheism and persecuted Christian groups for the first several years of its existence, resulting in East Germany having significantly higher levels of irreligion than West Germany. This divide persisted after the German reunification and still exists today.

Demographics 
A 2020 estimate shows that 40.7% of the German population were non-confessional and not members of any religious group. Christianity still has a notable presence in Western Germany, though a majority of the population in the northern states of Hamburg and Bremen are not registered members of the main Catholic and Protestant churches. When taken overall, Germany is one of the least religious countries.

As of 2009, more Germans are non-believers in Eastern Germany than Western Germany. Eastern Germany, which was historically Protestant, is perhaps the least religious region in the world. An explanation for this, popular in other regions, is the aggressive state atheist policies of the German Democratic Republic's Socialist Unity Party of Germany. However, the enforcement of atheism existed only for the first few years. After that, the state allowed churches to have a relatively high level of autonomy.  Atheism is embraced by Germans of all ages, though irreligion is particularly common among younger Germans. 
One study in September 2012 was unable to find a single person under 28 who believes in God.

See also
 Christianity in Germany
 Demographics of Germany
 Freedom of religion in Germany
 Humanistischer Verband Deutschlands
 Islam in Germany
 Party of Humanists
 Religion in Germany

References

 
Religion in Germany
Germany